The Second National Government of New Zealand (also known as the Holyoake Government, after head of government Keith Holyoake) was the government of New Zealand from 1960 to 1972. It was a conservative government which sought mainly to preserve the economic prosperity and general stability of the early 1960s. It was one of New Zealand's longest-serving governments.

Significant policies

Economic policy
Compulsory unionism was relaxed.
Negotiated continued access to United Kingdom markets following the UK's acceptance into the European Economic Community.

Treaty of Waitangi and Māori policy
Responded to the increasing urbanisation of the Māori people with a policy of cultural assimilation, which aimed to integrate Māori into Pākehā lifestyles. This policy included the abolition of the Native School system in 1969.
Amended the Waitangi Day Act 1960 to make Waitangi Day a public holiday in the Northland region.

Other
On 12 October 1961 ten National MPs voted with the Opposition and removed capital punishment for murder from the Crimes Bill that the government had introduced, by a vote of 41 to 30. Ralph Hanan, the Minister of Justice who had introduced the bill was one of them.
 Family maintenance allowances were introduced (1968).
 In 1967 after a referendum on 23 September, bar closing times were extended from 6pm to 10pm on 9 October.
 In 1968, emergency benefit was systematised into a discretionary Domestic Purposes Benefit (this was replaced by the statutory Domestic purposes Benefit in 1973).
 In 1969, the general medical services benefit was raised for beneficiaries, while specialist benefit was introduced.
 A rural incentives scheme for doctors was introduced (1969).
 Income abatement on benefits was simplified (1971).

Foreign affairs
New Zealand troops committed to the defence of Malaysia in the Indonesia-Malaysia confrontation.
Committed a small number of New Zealand troops to the Vietnam War.
Re-established compulsory military training.

Constitutional
Appointed the first New Zealand born Governor-General in 1967 (Sir Arthur Porritt) and the first New Zealand born and New Zealand resident Governor-General, Sir Denis Blundell in 1972.
Voting age lowered to 20, from 21.

Formation

The key issue of the 1960 election was the 'Black Budget' of 1958, in which the Labour government had raised taxes on alcohol, petrol and cigarettes. Although the government argued that it was necessary to address a balance of payments crisis, National continually attacked the government for it, and most historians consider that it lost Labour the election after only one term in office. Another, less important factor, may have been the age of Labour's leadership. Prime Minister Walter Nash was 78 in 1960, and had been Finance Minister in the first Labour government 25 years earlier. Voters probably considered him and many of his team old and out of touch in contrast with National leader Keith Holyoake, who in 1960 was only in his mid 50s.

The phrase Young Turk was used by Ian Templeton to describe three of the new National MPs elected in 1960, Peter Gordon, Duncan MacIntyre and Robert Muldoon. The description stuck (Zavos).

The 1963 election

In many ways the 1963 election was a re-run of the 1960 election. No new major issues had arisen, and Labour continued to be damaged by the 'Black Budget' of 1958. Although five years had passed since the budget, its architect, Arnold Nordmeyer, was now Labour Party leader following the retirement of Nash earlier in 1963. Voters continued to associate Nordmeyer, and therefore the party, with the unpopular budget. It is normal for governments to lose some support during their term, but National's share of the popular vote was only 0.5% less than in 1960, and it lost only one seat, retaining a majority of 10.

The 1966 election

Shortly before the 1966 election, Labour had replaced Nordmeyer as leader with Norman Kirk, but Kirk had insufficient time to consolidate his position and the party was damaged by this and division over economic policy. The main difference between the parties in terms of policy was commitment to the Vietnam War. The National government had committed a small number of troops, seeing support for American wars as a necessary payment for America's commitment (through the ANZUS pact) to protect New Zealand. Labour was opposed to New Zealand involvement in the war and made troop recall a major platform. However the strongest anti-war sentiment was probably amongst young people, and at this stage the voting age was 21. The election resulted in National losing 3.5% of the popular vote, and one seat, to Social Credit. This marked the first time since 1943 that a seat had been won by a party other than Labour or National.

The 1969 election

Before the 1969 election the voting age was lowered from 21 to 20, and the number of electorates was increased from 80 to 84, to reflect population growth. These changes seem to have benefited National, as its share of the popular vote rose by 1.6% and it regained the seat it had lost (Hobson) to Social Credit. This is a rare example of a government increasing its share of the vote while in power.

Defeat

Like Labour in 1960, National in 1972 appeared old, worn-out and out of touch. Holyoake's retirement in favour of deputy Jack Marshall did little to revitalise the party, as Marshall lacked the charisma of Labour leader Norman Kirk. The government was defeated less on any particular policy than on a general feeling that, as Labour's campaign material put it, it was time for a change.

Election results

Prime ministers
Keith Holyoake was Prime Minister for almost the entire term of this government, from 12 December 1960 until 7 February 1972 when he resigned. He was replaced by Jack Marshall, with the terms of other ministers commencing on 9 February 1972. The Marshall Ministry stepped down on 8 December 1972.

Cabinet ministers

References

See also
Governments of New Zealand
New Zealand National Party

Ministries of Elizabeth II
National 2
New Zealand National Party
20th century in New Zealand
1960 establishments in New Zealand
1972 disestablishments in New Zealand
Cabinets established in 1960
Cabinets disestablished in 1972